Vasyl Petrovych Fedoryshyn (born 31 March 1981) is a male wrestler from Ukraine, who competes in the men's -60 kg freestyle division.

Career
Fedoryshyn was born in Kalush, Ukrainian SSR. He competed in wrestling at the 2009 Maccabiah Games. Fedoryshyn finished fourth in the Men's Lightweight Freestyle event at the 2004 Summer Olympics in Athens, won a silver medal in the same event at the 2008 Summer Olympics in Beijing, and was eliminated in the first round of the 2012 Olympic tournament by Malkhaz Zarkua of Georgia. He won a bronze medal in the 60 kg event at the 2009 FILA Wrestling World Championships. and a silver medal in the same discipline at the 2010 edition, losing to Besik Kudukhov of Russia in the final. On 5 April 2017, it was announced that, as a result of retesting samples, he had been disqualified from the 2008 Olympics for a drug violation, and his silver medal withdrawn.

See also
List of select Jewish wrestlers

References

External links
 

1981 births
Living people
People from Kalush, Ukraine
Ukrainian Jews
Wrestlers at the 2004 Summer Olympics
Wrestlers at the 2008 Summer Olympics
Wrestlers at the 2012 Summer Olympics
Olympic wrestlers of Ukraine
Competitors at the 2009 Maccabiah Games
Maccabiah Games wrestlers
Maccabiah Games competitors for Ukraine
Ukrainian male sport wrestlers
World Wrestling Championships medalists
Competitors stripped of Summer Olympics medals
Doping cases in wrestling
Ukrainian sportspeople in doping cases
Sportspeople from Ivano-Frankivsk Oblast